The second goal in the United Nations Millennium Development Goal is to achieve Universal Primary Education, more specifically, to "ensure that by 2015, children everywhere, boys and girls alike will be required to complete a full course of primary schooling." Education is vital to meeting all other Millennium Development Goals: "Educating children gives the next generation the tools to fight poverty and prevent disease, including malaria and AIDS."
Despite the significance of investing in education, the recent report, Fixing the Broken Promise of Education for All: Findings from the Global Initiative on Out-of-School Children—produced by UNESCO Institute for Statistics and UNICEF found that the world has missed this 2015 target of universal primary education, and there are currently 58 million children, of primary school age, out of school worldwide.

Achieving universal primary education
Since 1999, there has been great progress towards achieving universal primary enrollment due in large part to a pursuit of the Millennium Development Goals (MDGs) and the Education for All (EFA)  The number of primary school age out-of-school children dropped by 42% between 2000 and 2012, despite rapid population growth.
Greater than half of countries and regions worldwide have a net enrolment rate of more than 95% and either already have or are close to achieving universal primary education.  However, despite an increase in enrollment over the past decade, global progress has stalled since 2007, and net enrolment or attendance is less than 80 per cent in about 20 countries.  Of the 58 million children out of school:

 23% attended school in the past but left
 43% are likely to never enter school
 34% are likely to enter school in the future

Roughly half of all out-of-school children come from just a few countries, many of them characterized by conflict, instability, and extreme poverty. West and Central Africa is home to one-third of all primary school age out-of-school children, making it the region with the lowest rates of school participation.  Challenges to achieving universal primary education are exacerbated in unstable regions, as they have greater difficulty in accessing financial support.

The barriers which prevent children around the world from obtaining primary level education are diverse and require tailored responses. Children living in conflict-affected areas account for "just 20% of the world's children of primary school age but 50% of the world's out-of-school children."  Additionally, inequalities in wealth significantly impact out-of-school rates. In many countries, children from the poorest 20 per cent of the population are less likely to attend school than those who are better off. Despite overall improvements, girls continue to be at a disadvantage as 53%—more than half—of the estimated 58 million primary age out-of-school-children are girls. A research paper published in December 2019 found that in 2017, 1 in 6 women aged 20–24 had not completed primary school.

Factors contributing to lack of access and poor attendance

Location (climate)
Location contributes to a child's lack of access and attendance to primary education.  In certain areas of the world it is more difficult for children to get to school.  For example; in high-altitude areas of India, severe weather conditions for more than 7 months of the year make school attendance erratic and force children to remain at home (Postiglione).

In these remote locations, insufficient school funds contribute to low attendance rates by creating undesirable and unsafe learning environments.  In 1996, the General Accounting Office (GAO) reported that poor conditions existed in many rural areas; one out of every two rural schools had at least one inadequate structural or mechanical feature (Lawrence).  In these situations where regular school attendance is rare, a low population contributes to the problem.  In other locations, large numbers are often the cause of low attendance rates.

Due to population growth, many urban schools have expanded their boundaries making school transportation more complicated.  "For over 50 years the U.S. has been shifting away from small, neighborhood schools to larger schools in lower density areas.  Rates of children walking and biking to school have declined significantly over this period" (Schlossberg).  There is evidence to prove that the distance to and from school contributes a child's attendance, or lack thereof.  In a study done investigating the relation between location (distance) and school attendance in Mali, about half the villages reported that the school was too far away, causing students not to enroll (Birdsall).

There is still speculation as to whether primary schools are more accessible in rural or urban areas because situations differ depending on geographic location.  In a study done examining the correlation between location and school attendance in Argentina and Panama, researchers found that urban residence was positively correlated with school attendance (De Vos), but another study in a Louisiana school district found that schools with the lowest attendance rates were in metropolitan areas (Moonie).

More research needs to be done to determine geography's specific effects on attendance, but no matter where you live, there is evidence that location will contribute to a child's access and attendance to education.

Gender
Gender contributes to a child's lack of access and attendance to education.  Although it may not be as an obvious a problem today, gender equality in education has been an issue for a long time.  Many investments in girls' education in the twentieth century addressed the widespread lack of access to primary education in developing countries (Dowd).

Although boys not in education outnumber girls in the majority of regions, in 2014, in those with the worst attendance girls outnumber boys, notably in Sub-Saharan Africa, resulting in the total number of girls out of education being approximately 11% higher than the number of boys, world-wide.

In 25 countries the proportion of boys enrolling in secondary school is higher than girls by 10% or more, and in five; India, Nepal, Togo, Turkey and Yemen, the gap exceeds 20%.  Enrollment is low for both boys and girls in sub-Saharan Africa, with rates of just 27% and 22%.  Girls trail respectively behind (Sylva).  It is generally believed that girls are often discouraged from attending primary schooling, especially in less developed countries for religious and cultural reasons, but there is little evidence available to support this association.  However, there is evidence to prove that the disparity of gender in education is real.  Today some 78% of girls drop out of school, compared with 48% of boys (Sylva).

Cost
Costs contribute to a child's lack of acquiescence and attendance to primary education.  High opportunity costs are often influential in the decision to attend school.  For example; an estimated 121 million children of primary-school age are being kept out of school to work in the fields or at home (UNICEF).  For many families in developing countries the economic benefits of no primary schooling are enough to offset the opportunity cost of attending.

Besides the opportunity costs associated with education, school fees can be very expensive, especially for poor households.  In rural China, families dedicate as much as a third of their income to school fees (Peverly).  Sometimes, the cost gets too expensive and families can't support their children's education anymore, although the statistics disagree.  "China has 108.6 million primary school students, with a 1 percent dropout rate, but experts doubt these figures because the dropout rates in rural areas appear much higher" (Peverly).

Although the relationship between school fees and attendance still isn't perfectly clear (Peverly), there is evidence to prove that cost is a factor that contributes to a child's access and attendance to primary education.

Language

In developing countries throughout the world the educational context is characterized not by monolingual settings, but rather multilingual situations.   Often children are asked to enroll in a primary school where the Medium of Instruction (MI) is not her home language, but rather the language of the government, or another dominant society .  Studies throughout the world demonstrate the importance of the MI in determining a child's educational attainment.  According to Mehrotra (1988) "In a situation where the parents are illiterate..., if the medium of instruction in school is a language that is not spoken at home the problems of learning in an environment characterized by poverty are compounded, and the chances of drop-out increase correspondingly. In this context, the experience of the high-achievers has been unequivocal: the mother tongue was used as the medium of instruction at the primary level in all cases. ... There is much research which shows that students learn to read more quickly when taught in their mother tongue. Second, students who have learned to read in their mother tongue learn to read in a second language more quickly than do those who are first taught to read in the second language. Third, in terms of academic learning skills as well, students taught to read in their mother tongue acquire such skills more quickly".  (See also Multilingual Education)

Education and global health
Education is a crucial factor in ending global poverty. With education, employment opportunities are broadened, income levels are increased and maternal and child health is improved.

In areas where access, attendance and quality of education have seen improvements, there has also been a slow in the spread of HIV/AIDS and an increase in the healthiness of the community in general. In fact, children of educated mothers are 50% more likely to live past the age of five. Not only does education improve individual and familial health, but it also improves the health of a community. In countries with solid education systems in place, there are lower crime rates, greater economic growth and improved social services.

School feeding programs
"There are approximately 300 million chronically hungry children in the world. One hundred million of them do not attend school, and two thirds of those not attending school are girls. World Food Programme's school feeding formula is simple: food attracts hungry children to school. An education broadens their options, helping to lift them out of poverty."–World Food Programme

One successful method to ensuring that children attend school on a regular basis is through school feeding programs.  Many different organizations fund school feeding programs, among them the World Food Programme and the World Bank.  The idea of a school feeding program is that children are provided with meals at school with the expectation that they will attend school regularly.  School feeding programs have proven a huge success because not only do the attendance rates increase, but in areas where food is scarce and malnutrition is extensive, the food that children are receiving at school can prove to be a critical source of nutrition.  School meals have led to improved concentration and performance of children in school.  Another aspect of school feeding programs is take home rations.  When economic reasons, the need to care for the elderly or a family member suffering from HIV, or cultural beliefs keep a parent from sending their child (especially a female child) to school, these take home rations provide incentives to sending their children to school rather than to work

Current efforts

Global Campaign for Education
This organization promotes education as a basic human right. It motivates people and groups to put public pressure on governments and the international community in order to assure that all children are provided with free, compulsory public education. It brings together major NGOs and Teachers Unions in over 120 countries to work in solidarity towards their vision of universal primary education.

Right to Education Project
The Right to Education Project aims to promote social mobilization and legal accountability, looking to focus on the legal challenges to the right to education.
To ensure continued relevance and engagement with activists and the academic community the Project also undertakes comparative research to advance an understanding of the right to education.

UNICEF
UNICEF believes that in treating education as a basic human right, it will address the basic inequalities in our society, especially gender inequalities. It advocates high-quality, child-friendly basic education for all, with an emphasis on gender equality and eliminating disparities of all kinds through a range of innovative programs and initiatives. In working with local, national and international partners, UNICEF's work supports the attainment of universal primary education.

Oxfam International
This organization is a confederation of 12 organizations that are dedicated to reducing poverty and eliminating injustices in the world. Oxfam works on a grassroots level in countries around the world to ensure that all people have access to the basic human rights, including education.

Save the Children
This organization advocates education as a way for individuals to escape poverty. They are running a campaign entitled "Rewrite the Future" to encouraging American citizens, in positions of power and wealth, to take action against the injustices in education systems around the world. Save the Children also operates education programs in 30 countries all over the world.

Peace Corps
This United States government organization has volunteers on the ground in 75 countries.  Many of the volunteers are working as teachers in rural areas or working to promote and improve access to education in the areas in which they are stationed.

United Nations Educational Scientific and Cultural Organization
UNESCO works to improve education through projects, advice, capacity-building and networking.  UNESCO's Education for All Campaign by 2015 is the driving force in UNESCO's work in the field of education at the moment.

World Bank
This organization provides financial and technical assistance to developing countries.  Loans and grants from the World Bank provide much of the funding for educational projects around the world, including but not limited to school feeding programs.

Child Aid
Child Aid conducts school- and library-based reading programs in over 50 indigenous villages in Guatemala, where literacy rates are lower than anywhere in Latin America. Through its literacy development programing it trains teachers and librarians, creates and improves community libraries and delivers tens of thousands of children's books annually.

World Food Program
This organization provides food relief in areas that need it most and is one of the major funders of school feeding programs.

Food and Agriculture Organization of the United Nations
This organization runs a campaign entitled Education for Rural People in which they work to ensure education for rural people as the key to reduction of poverty, food security and sustainable development.

Global Alliance for Improved Nutrition (GAIN)
This organization is a hub for organizations committed to ending vitamin and mineral deficiencies.  GAIN works with other international organizations, governments and the private sector to implement large-scale food fortification programs as well as targeted ones including school feeding projects aimed at the most at risk of malnutrition. Home Page

Global Partnership for Education (Formerly the Fast Track Initiative (FTI))
The Fast Track Initiative (FTI) was launched in 2002. It was designed as a major initiative to help countries achieve the Millennium Development Goal (MDG) of Universal Primary Education (UPE) by 2015. It was endorsed by the Development Committee of the World Bank as a 'process that would provide quick and incremental technical and financial support to countries that have policies but are not on track to attain Universal Primary Completion by 2015' (World Bank Development Committee, 2003). In 2011, the organization re-committed to achieving education for all children through their transformation into the Global Partnership for Education, reflecting the importance of uniting worldwide to achieve this goal.

The Walking School Bus 
The Walking School Bus (TWSB) was launched in 2015. TWSB empower educational attainment through mutually beneficial partnerships that promote: access, nutrition, and curriculum. TWSB mission is to empower students in developing countries to access education, thereby breaking down cultural and faith-based barriers, creating academic partnerships between both local and international schools and their respective communities, while helping provide sustainable and adequate nutrition for their partnered beneficiaries. TWSB currently work across North America, Uganda, South Africa, Greece, and India.  To find out more about their work, visit: http://thewalkingschoolbus.com/

Building Tomorrow
This Indianapolis, IN based social-profit empowers young people to support their peers in sub-Saharan Africa by raising funds and awareness for school infrastructure projects. They have built seven primary schools in Uganda since their inception in 2005 and are working to support the UN Millennium Development Goal of Universal Primary Education.

Education in Cambodia
Since the Khmer Rouge eliminated a large percentage of educated Cambodians, Cambodia has been lacking educated resources leading to a lower educational level.

In the United States

Teach for America
The mission of Teach for America is to address the inadequacies in the United States education system by placing highly qualified college graduates into under resourced schools for a two-year period in an attempt transform these leaders into lifelong advocates of education reform in the United States.

Our Education
This is a campaign to empower young people in the United States to stand up and speak out against the inadequacies in the United States education system and to demand change through political activism.

Breakthrough Collaborative
This organization empowers high potential middle school students from lower income communities to excel in school and at the same time inspires motivated high school and college students to pursue careers in education. It is a six-week summer enrichment program where "students teach students" run in more than 30 sites all over the United States.

The learning crisis 
The learning crisis is the reality that while the universal primary education access is a major global goal, a large proportion of children in school are not learning. A World Bank study found that "53 percent of children in low- and middle-income countries cannot read and understand a simple story by the end of primary school." While schooling has increased rapidly over the last few decades, learning has not followed suit.

See also
Education
Education For All
Human Rights
Millennium Development Goals
Right to Education
Learning crisis

References

Further reading

Douglas A. Sylva. The United Nations Children's Fund: Women or Children First? Diss. Catholic Family and Human Rights Institute, 2003. New York, New York, 2003.

Dowd, Amy Jo; Greer, Heather. Girls' Education: Community Approaches to Access and Quality. Strong Beginnings. Westport: Save the Children Federation, Inc., 2001.
FAO Rural Youth Development. Education for Rural People. 2002. 

Higher learning = Higher Earning: What You Need to Know About College and Careers. Center on Education Policy and American Youth Policy Forum. Washington, DC. September 2001.  Nov. 26, 2006.
Kawada, Eijiro. Eatonville Schools to Try Busing. The News Tribune.  Tacoma, WA. May 30, 2005.  Nov. 27, 2006. 
Lawrence, Barbara K. Save a Penny, Lose a School: The Real Cost of Deferred Maintenance. Diss. Rural School and Community Trust, 2003.
Malone, Susan. 2006.  "Bridging languages in education".  id21 insights.  Available online at 
 Mehrotra, S. (1998): Education for All: Policy Lessons From High-Achieving Countries:
UNICEF Staff Working Papers, New York, UNICEF.
Minneapolis Public Schools. Attendance Matters! 14 Oct. 2005 

New Ulm Sr. High School Report Card 2005.	

UNESCO. 2003. Education in a multilingual world.  Available online here.
UNESCO. 2005. First Language First: community based literacy programmes for minority language contexts in Asia.  Available online here.
Walter, Steven.  2000. Explaining Multilingual Education:. Information on Some Tough Questions, University of North Dakota Working Papers in Linguistics.  Available online here.

External links
"Educate a Woman, You Educate a Nation" - South Africa Aims to Improve its Education for Girls, WNN — Women News Network. Aug. 28, 2007. Lys Anzia
Right to Education Project
(PDF)UN Millennium Project

CRIN
and health
HIV UNESCO
World Bank
FAO
Gain Health
Universal Primary Education Goal Tracker
Time for School An ongoing PBS documentary series that follows 7 children from 7 countries who are struggling to achieve a basic education. The series continues through 2015, the U.N.'s target date for achieving universal education (MDG #2).
Fast Track Initiative - Education for All

Primary education
Millennium Development Goals